Laurent Prades (born 19 July 1968) is a former professional tennis player from France.

Prades qualified for his first Grand Slam tournament in 1989, at the Australian Open. He played West German Hans-Dieter Beutel in the opening round and was beaten, despite winning the first two sets. It wasn't until the 1992 French Open that he got another chance to play a Grand Slam, entering the event as a wildcard. He defeated Byron Black in the first round and then met third seed Pete Sampras. The American won in straight sets, although Prades did manage to force two of those sets into tiebreaks.

Challenger titles

Singles: (1)

References

1968 births
Living people
French male tennis players
Tennis players from Bordeaux